Spiesen-Elversberg is a municipality in the district of Neunkirchen, in Saarland, Germany. It is situated approximately 4 km southwest of Neunkirchen, and 15 km northeast of Saarbrücken.

References

Neunkirchen (German district)